The Grisons Striped goat breed from Switzerland is very well adapted to mountainous landscapes.  Breeders are in the process of selectively breeding it for improved milk production.

Sources
Grisons Striped Goat

Goat breeds
Dairy goat breeds
Goat breeds originating in Switzerland